A  list of earliest films produced in Azerbaijan ordered by year of release in the 1990s:

1990s

External links
 Azerbaijani film at the Internet Movie Database
 Azerbaycan Kinosu

1990
Azerb
Films